A by-election was held for the New South Wales Legislative Assembly electorate of East Macquarie on 13 August 1892 because James Tonkin resigned due to bankruptcy.

Dates

Result

James Tonkin resigned due to bankruptcy.

See also
Electoral results for the district of East Macquarie
List of New South Wales state by-elections

Note

References

1892 elections in Australia
New South Wales state by-elections
1880s in New South Wales